Understanding is a psychological process through which one is able to think about and deal with an abstraction or object.

Understanding may also refer to:

 Natural language understanding
 Query understanding
 Understanding (Kant), a concept in Kantian philosophy
 Understanding (TV series), a documentary television series
 Understanding (Bobby Womack album)
 Understanding (John Patton album)
Understanding (Wallace Roney album)
 Understanding (Xscape album)
 "Understanding" (song), title song from this album
 Understanding, album by Mirah
 "Understanding", a song by Bob Seger
 "Understanding", a song by Candlebox from the album Lucy
 "Understanding", a song by Collective Soul from the album Collective Soul
 "Understanding", a song by Evanescence

See also
 Understand (disambiguation)
 I Understand (disambiguation)
 The Understanding (disambiguation)
 Verstehen ("understanding"), in the context of social sciences, is used with the particular sense of the "interpretive or participatory" examination of social phenomena